Mário Cotrim, mostly known by his stage name ProfJam aka Docente Compota (born 6 June 1991), is a Portuguese rapper and hip hop singer.

Career 
Profjam started doing his own rhymes in 2008. His first exposition to the Hip Hop audience occurred when he participated in the Portuguese competition "Liga Knockout", where rappers had to make their own rhymes in order to defeat their opponent in a 1v1 punchlines battle. Docente Compota met Carlos Gonçalves at this stage in his career. A lot of his rhymes were influence by him. To this day they still talk and write together.

Later on, after dropping from a Computer Science and Information Systems degree at Instituto Superior Técnico, he went to London to pursue a degree on Audio Production, in the SAE Institute.

In 2016, he created his own record label, Think Music Records. The label has been growing over the years and has become one of the most popular Hip Hop labels in Portugal. Think Music Records produced for known Portuguese artists such as Yuzi, SippinPurpp, Mike El Nite, Lon3r Johny, among others.

In January 2019, it was announced that ProfJam will perform on the main stage of Super Bock Super Rock 2019, on 20 July. In 2018 he performed at the same music festival but on the secondary stage.

After he released his album #FFFFFF in February 2019, the numbers started to appear, as almost every song on the album got to the top 100 of Associação Fonográfica Portuguesa singles charts. The song "Tou Bem" featuring Lhast, got to the number 1 spot on the Portuguese charts and on the main social media streaming services, like YouTube or Spotify. The records, "Água de Côco" and "Tou Bem" reached the platinum certification as they got over 20,000 sales registered by AFP. The album reached the number 1 spot on the Portuguese charts in March 2019.

On 5 August 2020, ProfJam will perform at the MEO Stage of MEO Sudoeste.(Canceled due to the COVID-19 pandemic)

Personal life 
On 10 October 2019, he was hospitalized after suffering from a psychosis due to drug abuse while he was writing his new song "Anjos e Demónios".

Discography

Mixtapes

Albums

Studio albums

Collaborative albums

Singles

As lead artist

As featured artist

Awards

See also 

 Think Music Records
 List of number-one singles of 2019 (Portugal)
 List of number-one albums of 2019 (Portugal)

External links
 YouTube
 Spotify
 Apple Music
 Google Play
 Tidal
 Deezer
 Instagram
 Twitter
 Facebook

References 

Living people
1991 births
Portuguese rappers
21st-century Portuguese male singers
Singers from Lisbon